The Lindsay House  is a historic building located in Iowa City, Iowa, United States.  It was listed, misspelled as the Linsay House, on the National Register of Historic Places in 1977.  The house was built in 1893 by John Jayne, an Iowa City bridge builder. The plans for the 2½-story, frame, Queen Anne were purchased from George F. Barber and Co.  It features a chimney that takes up an entire corner of the main facade,  a stone arch that surrounds the first-floor window with leaded glass in a sunflower pattern, a wrap-around porch with a corner turret, and a three-story octagonal tower behind it.

Jayne gave the house as a wedding gift to his daughter, Ella, and her husband, John Granger Lindsay. The Lindsays moved to Chicago in 1913. The house was subsequently divided into apartments, and in 2005 became a 10-bedroom unit of the River City Housing Collective. It is perhaps most famous as the model for the boarding house in the comic strip Bloom County, and where the strip is partially set. Berkeley Breathed, who wrote the comic strip, called the house one of “the ugliest houses in the five-state area... Six different architectural styles in one house is a milestone at least and at most a landmark to bad taste”.

See also
List of George Franklin Barber works

References

Houses completed in 1893
Queen Anne architecture in Iowa
Houses in Iowa City, Iowa
National Register of Historic Places in Iowa City, Iowa
Houses on the National Register of Historic Places in Iowa